Sarin may refer to:
 Sarin, Kermanshah
 Sarin, Zanjan
 Sarin, alternate name of Sazin, Zanjan Province